Horace Wheddon (1891–1959) was a British cinematographer. He worked at one point for British Instructional Films, which was then merged into the major studio British International Pictures.

Selected filmography
 The Conspirators (1924)
 Mons (1926)
 The Further Adventures of the Flag Lieutenant (1927)
 The Fake (1927)
 The Passing of Mr. Quinn (1928)
 The Clue of the New Pin (1929)
 The Squeaker (1930)
 Dreyfus (1931)
 P.C. Josser (1931)
 Love Lies (1931)
 Brother Alfred (1932)
 Holiday Lovers (1932)
 Music Hath Charms (1935)
 Royal Cavalcade (1935)
 R.A.F. (1935)
 McGlusky the Sea Rover (1935)
 I Live Again (1936)
 Cotton Queen (1937)

References

Bibliography
 Low, Rachael. ''History of the British Film: Filmmaking in 1930s Britain. George Allen & Unwin, 1985 .

External links

1891 births
1958 deaths
British cinematographers
People from Kentish Town